The water opossum (Chironectes minimus), also locally known as the yapok, is a marsupial of the family Didelphidae. It is the only living member of its genus, Chironectes. This semiaquatic creature is found in and near freshwater streams and lakes from Mexico through Central and South America to Argentina and is the most aquatic living marsupial (the lutrine opossum also has semiaquatic habits). It is also the only living marsupial in which both sexes have a pouch. The thylacine, commonly referred to as the Tasmanian tiger, also exhibited this trait, but it is now extinct.

The water opossum lives in bankside burrows, emerging after dusk to swim and search for fish, crustaceans and other aquatic animals, which it eats on the bank.

Origin of the name
The local name for the water opossum, "yapok", probably comes from the name of the Oyapok River in French Guiana.

Physical appearance

The water opossum is a small opossum, 27-32.5 cm long, with a 36–40 cm long tail. The fur is in a marbled grey and black pattern, while the muzzle, eyestripe, and crown are all black. A light band runs across the forehead anterior to the ears, which are rounded and naked. There are sensory facial bristles in tufts above each eye, as well as whiskers. The water opossum's tail, furred and black at the base, is yellow or white at its end. The hindfeet of the water opossum are webbed, while the forefeet ("hands") are not. The forefeet can be used to feel for and grab prey as the animal swims, propelled by its tail and webbed back feet. Unlike other didelphids, the water opossum does not have a cloaca.

Aquatic adaptations
The water opossum has several adaptations for its watery lifestyle. It has short, dense fur, which is water-repellent. The broad hindfeet are webbed and are used for propulsion through water, moving with alternate strokes. They are symmetrical as well, which distributes force equally along both borders of the webbing; this increases the efficiency of the water opossum's movement through the water. The water opossum's long tail also aids in swimming.

Being a marsupial and at the same time an aquatic animal, the water opossum has evolved a way to protect its young while swimming. A strong ring of muscle makes the pouch (which opens to the rear) watertight, so the young remain dry, even when the mother is totally immersed in water. The male also has a pouch (although not as watertight as the female's), where he places his genitalia before swimming. This is thought to prevent them from becoming entangled in aquatic vegetation and is probably helpful in streamlining the animal as well.

Reproduction
Water opossums mate in December and a litter of 1-5 young is born 12 to 14 days later in the nest. By 22 days the offspring are beginning to show some fur, and by 40 days or so their eyes are open, their bodies protruding from the mother's pouch. At 48 days of age, the young opossums detach from the nipples, but they still nurse and sleep with the mother.

Fossil record
The water opossum seems to have a history dating as far back as to the Pliocene Epoch. The first Pliocene occurrences were recorded in 1902, 1906, and 1917 when two fragments of left mandibular ramus with alveoli (characterized as MACN 2464 and MACN 3515), as well as the fragment of the distal end of a humerus (MACN 3675) were collected near the city of Parani, Entre Rios Province, Argentina. The mandibular fossils, MACN 2464 and 3515 were known to be from the water opossum because their teeth were nearly indistinguishable from living populations of the organism in present day. Additionally, water opossum teeth are characteristically different from other didelphids, likely because they are the only semi-aquatic marsupials, making these teeth easy to identify.

Holocene subfossil fragments of Chironectes have been discovered in São Paulo, Brazil. Also, there are fossil specimens from the late Pleistocene-Recent cave deposits in Minas Gerais, Brazil, as well as from the late Pliocene in Entre Ríos Province, Argentina.

Subspecies
Chironectes minimus argyrodytes
Chironectes minimus langsdorffi
Chironectes minimus minimus
Chironectes minimus panamensis

References

Footnotes

Bibliography

External links

 
Oxford University Press, Journal of Mammalogy, Volume 90, Issue 1, 18 February 2009, Pages 93–103
 

Opossums
Aquatic mammals
Marsupials of North America
Marsupials of Central America
Marsupials of South America
Mammals of Argentina
Mammals of Bolivia
Mammals of Brazil
Mammals of Colombia
Mammals of Ecuador
Mammals of French Guiana
Mammals of Guyana
Mammals of Mexico
Mammals of Paraguay
Mammals of Peru
Mammals of Suriname
Mammals of Venezuela
Mammals of Trinidad and Tobago
Mammals of the Caribbean
Mammals described in 1780
Taxa named by Eberhard August Wilhelm von Zimmermann